The 1944 Segunda División Peruana, the second division of Peruvian football (soccer), was played by 5 teams. The tournament winner, Ciclista Lima was promoted to the Promotional Playoff. Atlético Lusitania was promoted to the 1945 Segunda División Peruana.

Results

Standings

Promotion playoff

External links
 La Historia de la Segunda 1944

 

Peruvian Segunda División seasons
Peru2
2